131 Air Defence Regiment is an Air Defence regiment of the Indian Army.

Formation 
The regiment was raised on 24 September 1968 as a territorial army regiment at Siliguri, West Bengal.

History 
At the time of its formation, the Regiment was equipped with Bofors 40 mm L-60 anti-aircraft guns, it had inherited from 106 Heavy Anti Aircraft Territorial Army. On 15 September 1973, the regiment was converted into a regular air defence regiment. In due course, it was equipped with the 40 mm L/70 gun and the Super Fledermaus radar. It presently also has the Flycatcher (KL/MSS-6720) radar system and the Tactical Control Radar (TCR).

Operations
The regiment has taken part in the following operations-
Indo-Pakistani War of 1971: It provided air defence protection to 16 Field Ammunition Depot, Bagdogra Airfield, 33 Corps Signal Centre, Shahbad signal unit and other locations.
Operation Trident: It provided cover to Ammunition Supply Depot and Mirthal bridge between January and May 1987.
Operation Rakshak: Between June 1990 and March 1991 at Baroda and Jamnagar.
Bombay riots: The regiment aided civil authority during the Mumbai riots (Operation Vyavastha) in December 1992.
Operation Vijay: Various subunits provided air defence protection from May 1999. The unit was repositioned in the order of battle with 785 (Independent) Air Defence Brigade from July 1999 in the 2 Corps zone.
Operation Parakram: Subunits provided air defence protection between December 2001 to December 2002 to Headquarters 10 Corps, Corps Logistics Node North, Corps Logistics Node South, Bhatinda railway station and Ammunition Depots.
2008 Mumbai attacks: One column of the unit was mobilised to cordon Hotel Taj at Mumbai, after the terrorists stuck and took people hostage.
Indian Army operations in Jammu and Kashmir: Subunits of the regiment were deployed in counter insurgency operation in Jammu and Kashmir between August 1993 and December 1995 and again between August 2015 and July 2017.

Honours and awards
131 AD Regiment was awarded the General Officer Commanding in Chief (Southern Command)’s Unit Citation in 2015 
The Regiment has been awarded the Director General Army Air Defence’s (DGAAD) unit appreciation award three times (2005, 2008 and 2013).
In addition, it has won 4 Sena Medals, 1 mentioned in dispatches, 5 COAS Commendation Cards, 2 C-in-C Strategic Forces Commendation Cards, 1 Chief of Air Staff Commendation Card and 48 GOC-in-C Commendation Cards.

Notable Officers
Lieutenant General PK Pahwa, PVSM – 5th Commanding Officer and 1st Director General, Corps of Army Air Defence
Lieutenant General Ashwini Kumar, PVSM, AVSM, VSM, ADC – Adjutant-General

References

Military units and formations established in 1968
Air defence regiments of the Indian Army
Air defence units and formations